Trained Bands were companies of part-time militia in England and Wales. Organised by county, they were supposed to drill on a regular basis, although this was rarely the case in practice. The regular army was formed from the Trained Bands in the event of war, though the inability or unwillingness of many of the bands to serve outside of their home regions often left the army short on manpower compared to the paper strength implied by the Trained Bands rolls.

They later became common in the American colonies, where they are normally referred to as Trainbands. Similar organisations include the Dutch Schutterij, and the Swiss militia, elements of which remain in existence today.

Trained Bands in England and Wales 

Founded in 1572, and organised by county, it was not until the 'Exact Militia Programme' of 1625 that they began to have regular training and weapons drill. Even then, standards varied considerably, and depended on the level of financial support by the local gentry. Although Charles I tried to assemble armies of around 30,000 militia for the 1639 and 1640 Bishops' Wars, there was considerable reluctance to serve outside their counties, and a proportion were armed only with Longbows. In 1588, the Trained Bands consisted of 79,798 men, categorized by their primary weapon: 36% arquebusiers, 6% musketeers, 16% bowmen, 26% pikemen, and 16% billmen.J. Tincey and R. Hook, The Armada Campaign (1996), p. 47.

A standard drill book was issued in February 1638, which was used throughout the 1639 to 1653 Wars of the Three Kingdoms, together with a muster roll by county. This shows large variations in size, equipment and training; the largest was Yorkshire, which had 12,000 men, then London, with 8,000, increased in 1642 to 20,000. Counties like Shropshire or Glamorgan had fewer than 500 men.

In the early stages of the 1642 to 1646 First English Civil War, the Trained Bands provided the bulk of the forces used by both Royalists and Parliamentarians, but were often unwilling to serve outside their home areas. They were rapidly replaced by more professional bodies, the most important being the New Model Army.

American train bands   

In the early American colonies the trained band was the most basic tactical unit. However, no standard company size existed and variations were wide.  As population grew these companies were organised into regiments to allow better management.  But trainbands were not combat units.  Generally, upon reaching a certain age a man was required to join the local trainband in which he received periodic training for the next couple of decades.  In wartime, military forces were formed by selecting men from trainbands on an individual basis and then forming them into a fighting unit.

The exact derivation and usage is not clear.  A nineteenth-century dictionary says, under "Train":

The issue is whether the men "received training" in the modern sense, or whether they were "in the train" or retinue or were otherwise organised around a military "train" as in horse-drawn artillery.

In the 17th century New England colonial militia units were usually referred to as "train bands" or, sometimes, "trained bands".  Typically, each town would elect three officers to lead its train band with the ranks of captain, lieutenant and ensign.  As the populations of towns varied widely, larger towns usually had more than one train band.  In the middle of the 1600s train bands began to be referred to as companies.

On December 13, 1636 the Massachusetts Militia was organised into three regiments - North, South and East.  As there are National Guard units descendants of these regiments, this date is used as the "birthday" of the National Guard, despite the fact that citizen militias in the American Colonies date back to the Jamestown settlement in 1607.

References

Sources
 
 Mark Charles Fissell, The Bishops' Wars: Charles I's campaigns against Scotland 1638–1640, Cambridge: Cambridge University Press, 1994, .

External links
 

Infantry units and formations
Militia in the United States
Militia of the United Kingdom